Allá en el Rancho Grande is a 1936 Mexican romantic drama film directed by Fernando de Fuentes and starring Tito Guízar and Esther Fernández.  The film is considered to be the one that started the Golden Age of Mexican cinema.

Plot

The owner and the general manager of a ranch (Rancho Grande), two good friends, fall in love with the same girl at the same time. The owner tries to 'buy' the girl without knowing she is in love with the manager.

Cast

 Tito Guízar as Francisco
 Esther Fernández as Cruz
 René Cardona as Felipe

Music 
 "Allá en el Rancho Grande", sang by Tito Guízar

Reception
The film was a big hit and made a profit of over $400,000.

Remake
In 1949, it was remade by the same director and shot in colour with new principals.

References

External links
 
 

Mexican black-and-white films
1936 romantic drama films
1930s Spanish-language films
Films directed by Fernando de Fuentes
Mexican romantic drama films
1930s Mexican films